The Man Who Won (1919 film), 1919 American silent film directed by Paul Scardon
The Man Who Won (1923 film), 1923 American silent film directed by William Wellman